Christina Eklund (born 19 January 1970) is a Swedish biathlete. She competed at the 1992 Winter Olympics and the 1994 Winter Olympics.

References

1970 births
Living people
Biathletes at the 1992 Winter Olympics
Biathletes at the 1994 Winter Olympics
Swedish female biathletes
Olympic biathletes of Sweden
Place of birth missing (living people)